No Visible Trauma is a 2020 Canadian documentary film, directed by Marc Serpa Francoeur and Robinder Uppal. The film documents several allegations of abuse of power against the Calgary Police.

Synopsis 
It centres on the cases of Godfred Addai-Nyamekye, a person of colour who was involuntarily transported to the city limits and left to freeze in below-zero weather after a routine traffic stop, and was eventually tasered and beaten by the police officer who responded after Addai-Nyamekye called 911; Daniel Haworth, a man who suffered a permanent brain injury when he was thrown to the ground by the same police officer who had tasered Addai-Nyamekye, eventually contributing to Haworth's subsequent death of a drug overdose; and Anthony Heffernan, a man who died after being shot four times by police on an apparently routine wellness check.

Critical reception 
Now described the story telling as simple and direct and praised the documentary for avoiding stylistic drama and just telling the clear story of police abuse of power.

Television edit 
A shorter edit of the film, titled Above the Law, aired on CBC Television in July 2020 as an episode of CBC Docs POV, prior to the full film's theatrical premiere at the 2020 Vancouver International Film Festival. Above the Law received a nomination for the Donald Brittain Award at the 9th Canadian Screen Awards in 2021.

See also 

 Killing of Latjor Tuel

References

External links

2020 films
2020 documentary films
Canadian documentary films
Films shot in Calgary
Documentary films about law enforcement in Canada
2020s English-language films
Films about police corruption
Films about police brutality
Works about police brutality
2020s Canadian films